Menatalla Karim (born 12 November 1995) is an Egyptian canoeist. She competed in the women's K-1 200 metres event at the 2016 Summer Olympics.

References

External links
 

1995 births
Living people
Egyptian female canoeists
Olympic canoeists of Egypt
Canoeists at the 2016 Summer Olympics
Place of birth missing (living people)